Lewis J. Smith   was a professional baseball player who played in the outfield in one game for the 1882 Baltimore Orioles in the American Association. He is often listed as just "L. Smith" in most sources.

External links

Baltimore Orioles (AA) players
Major League Baseball outfielders
Baseball players from Maryland
19th-century baseball players
1858 births
Year of death missing